The group stage of the 2013–14 UEFA Champions League was played from 17 September to 11 December 2013. A total of 32 teams competed in the group stage.

Draw
The draw was held on 29 August 2013, 17:45 CEST (UTC+2), at the Grimaldi Forum, Monaco. The 32 teams were allocated into four pots based on their UEFA club coefficients at the beginning of the season, with the title holders being placed in Pot 1 automatically. They were drawn into eight groups of four containing one team from each of the four seeding pots, with the restriction that teams from the same national association could not be drawn against each other. Moreover, the draw was controlled for teams from the same association in order to split the teams evenly into the two sets of groups (A–D, E–H) for maximum television coverage.

The fixtures were decided after the draw. On each matchday, four groups played their matches on Tuesday, while the other four groups played their matches on Wednesday, with the two sets of groups (A–D, E–H) alternating between each matchday. There were other restrictions, e.g., teams from the same city (e.g., Chelsea and Arsenal, Manchester United and Manchester City, Real Madrid and Atlético Madrid) in general did not play at home on the same matchday (UEFA tried to avoid teams from the same city playing at home on the same day or on consecutive days), and Russian teams did not play at home on the last matchday due to cold weather.

Teams
Below were the 32 teams which qualified for the group stage (with their 2013 UEFA club coefficients), grouped by their seeding pot. They included 22 teams which entered in this stage, and the 10 winners of the play-off round (5 in Champions Route, 5 in League Route).

Notes

Format
In each group, teams played against each other home-and-away in a round-robin format. The group winners and runners-up advanced to the round of 16, while the third-placed teams entered the Europa League round of 32.

Tiebreakers
The teams are ranked according to points (3 points for a win, 1 point for a draw, 0 points for a loss). If two or more teams are equal on points on completion of the group matches, the following criteria are applied to determine the rankings:
higher number of points obtained in the group matches played among the teams in question;
superior goal difference from the group matches played among the teams in question;
higher number of goals scored in the group matches played among the teams in question;
higher number of goals scored away from home in the group matches played among the teams in question;
If, after applying criteria 1 to 4 to several teams, two teams still have an equal ranking, criteria 1 to 4 are reapplied exclusively to the matches between the two teams in question to determine their final rankings. If this procedure does not lead to a decision, criteria 6 to 8 apply;
superior goal difference from all group matches played;
higher number of goals scored from all group matches played;
higher number of coefficient points accumulated by the club in question, as well as its association, over the previous five seasons.

Groups
The matchdays were 17–18 September, 1–2 October, 22–23 October, 5–6 November, 26–27 November, and 10–11 December 2013. The match kickoff times were 20:45 CEST/CET, except for matches in Russia which were 18:00 CEST/CET.

Times are CET/CEST, as listed by UEFA (local times are in parentheses).

Group A

Group B

The match was abandoned after 31 minutes due to heavy snow, and was resumed on 11 December 2013, 14:00, from the point of abandonment.

Group C

Tiebreakers
Olympiacos are ranked ahead of Benfica on head-to-head points.

Group D

Tiebreakers
Bayern Munich are ranked ahead of Manchester City on head-to-head goal difference.

Viktoria Plzeň are ranked ahead of CSKA Moscow on head-to-head away goals.

Notes

Group E

Group F

Tiebreakers
Borussia Dortmund, Arsenal, and Napoli are ranked on head-to-head goal difference.

Group G

Tiebreakers
Porto are ranked ahead of Austria Wien on head-to-head points.

Notes

Group H

Notes

References

External links
2013–14 UEFA Champions League

Group Stage
2013-14